Sesame Street 4-D Movie Magic (titled Sesame Street Presents Lights Camera Imagination! 4-D at SeaWorld and Busch Gardens Williamsburg parks, and Sesame Street Film Festival 4-D at Busch Gardens Tampa) is a 4D film theme park attraction located at Universal Studios Japan, SeaWorld San Antonio, formerly at SeaWorld San Diego, Busch Gardens Williamsburg and Busch Gardens Tampa Bay. The attraction, which was made to run at Universal Studios Japan, was later acquired by SeaWorld Parks and Entertainment to run at their Busch Gardens and SeaWorld theme parks. In addition, Busch Gardens parks also include multiple other Sesame Street themed attractions, as part of their Sesame Street Forest of Fun/Sesame Street Safari of Fun park areas. The attraction contains 4-D effects to go along with the film which include spraying water, bursts of air, leg ticklers and fans.

On August 5, 2010, Busch Gardens Tampa Bay announced that Pirates 4-D would return to the Timbuktu Theater. There will be three showings of the Sesame Street 4-D Film Festival film followed by three showings of the Pirates film.

Differences

There are multiple differences between the SeaWorld version of the film versus the original Universal version. This is due to the film having been created for Universal Studios Japan, and so, there are changes in the structure of the Busch Gardens and SeaWorld theaters from the Universal Studios one. This resulted in the experience having to be slightly changed as well, most notably re-dubbing from Japanese to English for the American audiences.

In the SeaWorld films, there is no pre-show, and instead, the preshow to the film is merged into the actual film, resulting in the guests having to wait through the first seven minutes until putting on the glasses before the 3-D effects start. Also at the SeaWorld attractions, the postshow with Elmo being interviewed does not play, but a commercial for SeaWorld Parks and Entertainment's own Sesame Place park instead plays on the theater screen while guests exit, and brochures for Sesame Place are on display at the theater exit.

Summary
Once the guests are inside the ride, a curtain opens and it shows the Sesame Street sign. Then, Big Bird, who is wearing 4-D glasses of his own, appears and compliments the audience on their 4-D glasses. Afterwards, he announces the sponsors, 4 and D, which are presented by the Twiddlebugs. The scene quickly changes to the Around the Corner area of Sesame Street, where Big Bird walks out of the subway station and sings, "Welcome to Sesame Street". Following the song, Big Bird feels so happy, but suddenly, he notices Bert, Ernie, Grover, Telly, Zoe, and Cookie Monster feeling all sad. He asks them what's wrong and Grover says that everyone was going to present their home movies to everyone, but the projector broke. Elmo then zooms down the street with his tricycle but crashes it into Oscar's trash can. Much to his dismay, Oscar yells, "Hey! What's all the racket? Keep it down!" Then, Elmo remembers that creating movies needs imagination. Therefore, he decides to let everyone show what they did in their movies by using their imaginations. This delights everyone, except Oscar, who tells Elmo to "SCRAM!". One by one, each character does their imaginative interpretation of their home movies via 4-D effects. Oscar finally gives in and does his interpretation of his own movie, which happens to be trash all over Sesame Street. Then, a chorus line of stinky socks sings, "I Love Trash". Suddenly, a thunderstorm hits, drenching all the props. Elmo feels very disappointed that his imaginative movie did not go according to as planned, but Big Bird suggests to him that he should change the movie by using his own imagination. Feeling better about himself, Elmo requests help from the audience by imagining that it's a sunny day.  Then, the street changes to a birthday party scene where Elmo sings and flies away on a bunch of balloons and sings. Everyone else also chips in with the movie, making it a big success. Elmo thanks the audience for their help and remembers "Elmo Loves You" very much and everyone says goodbye. Then, Oscar, gets a bouquet of flowers but feels displeased about it. He angrily closes his trash can lid as a "The End" sign appears. Finally, the Twiddlebugs say goodbye as well and fly away.

English Voice
Fran Brill as Zoe and Prairie Dawn
Kevin Clash as Elmo
Jerry Nelson as Count von Count
Stephanie D'Abruzzo as Singing Socks
Eric Jacobson as Grover and Bert
Joey Mazzarino as Telly's stunt chicken and Two-Headed Monster (left head)
Martin P. Robinson as Telly and Pesties
David Rudman as Cookie Monster and Two-Headed Monster (right head)
Matt Vogel as Big Bird (puppetry and singing voice)
Caroll Spinney as Big Bird and Oscar (voices only)
John Tartaglia as Ernie and Oscar (puppetry only)

Japanese Voice
 Elmo, Bert, Grover: Kōji Ochiai
 Big Bird, Ernie: Mitsuaki Madono
 Cookie Monster, Oscar the Grouch, Count von Count: Tōru Ōkawa
 Telly Monster: Tesshō Genda
 Prairie Dawn, Zoe: Sakiko Tamagawa
 Rosita: Roko Takizawa

References

See also
Universal Studios Japan
SeaWorld San Diego
Busch Gardens Williamsburg
Busch Gardens Tampa Bay
Grover's Alpine Express
Air Grover

2003 3D films
Universal Parks & Resorts films
SeaWorld San Diego
Universal Studios Japan
Universal Studios Dubailand
Universal Parks & Resorts attractions by name
Amusement rides introduced in 2003
Amusement rides introduced in 2008
Amusement rides introduced in 2009
Amusement rides introduced in 2010
Amusement rides based on television franchises
3D short films
2003 establishments in Japan
2009 establishments in Virginia
2010 establishments in Florida
2008 establishments in California
2011 establishments in Texas
2010s disestablishments in Florida
2012 disestablishments in California
Licensed properties at Universal Parks & Resorts
ja:セサミストリート 4-D ムービーマジック